Hypanchyla is a monotypic snout moth genus described by William Warren in 1891. Its single species, Hypanchyla maricalis, described by Francis Walker in 1859, is known from Borneo.

References

Pyralinae
Monotypic moth genera
Moths of Asia
Pyralidae genera